This is a list of the longest-running United States television series, ordered by number of years the show has been aired. This list includes only first-run series originating in North America and available throughout the United States via national broadcast networks, U.S. cable networks, or syndication.  Series continuations (with name changes and/or changes in network) are noted. Series broadcast within the U.S. but produced in other countries, such as Coronation Street (62 years) and Doctor Who (59 years) are not included (see: List of longest-running British television programmes).

At least 60 years

50–59 years

40–49 years

35–39 years

30–34 years

25–29 years

20–24 years

15–19 years

10–14 years

See also

Lists of longest-running U.S. shows by broadcast type:
 List of longest-running American cable television series
 List of longest-running American broadcast network television series
 List of longest-running American primetime television series
 List of longest-running American first-run syndicated television series
Lists of longest-running shows internationally:
 List of longest-running television shows by category – international list
 List of longest-running Indian television series
 List of longest-running British television programmes
 List of longest-running Australian television series
 List of longest-running Philippine television series
 List of longest-running Spanish television series
List of shortest running shows:
 List of television series canceled after one episode
 List of television series canceled before airing an episode

Notes

References

Further reading
 Tim Brooks and Earle Marsh. The Complete Directory to Prime Time Network and Cable TV Shows 1946–present. .
 TV Guide Guide to TV (2006). .

 
Longest-running television